Arturo Chiappe (24 March 1889 – 7 January 1952) was an Argentine footballer. He played in 16 matches for the Argentina national football team from 1910 to 1916. He was also part of Argentina's squad for the 1916 South American Championship.

References

External links
 

1889 births
1952 deaths
Argentine footballers
Argentina international footballers
Place of birth missing
Association football defenders
Club Atlético River Plate footballers